The Benue River, previously known as the Chadda River or Tchadda, is the major tributary of the Niger River. As a result, it is an important transportation route in the regions through which it flows.

Geography
It rises in the Adamawa Plateau of northern Cameroon, from where it flows west, and through the town of Garoua and Lagdo Reservoir, into Nigeria south of the Mandara mountains, and through Jimeta, Ibi and Makurdi before meeting the Niger River at Lokoja.

Large tributaries are the Faro River, the Gongola River and the Mayo Kébbi, which connects it with the Logone River (part of the Lake Chad system) during floods. Other tributaries are Taraba River and River Katsina Ala.

At the point of confluence, the Benue exceeds the Niger by volume. During the following decades, the runoff of both rivers decreased markedly due to irrigation.

The Benue River flooded in October 2012, resulting in a large increase in the population of venomous snakes in the Duguri District, Alkaleri Local Government Area, Bauchi State. A July 2013 report indicated that over 200 people in the district had died of snakebite. The General Hospital in Kaltungo, Gombe State in Nigeria, is the nearest location for treatment of snakebite; "whoever is lucky to make it to Kaltungo is treated in only two days and then they return home."

References

External links

 
Tributaries of the Niger River
Rivers of Cameroon
Rivers of Nigeria
International rivers of Africa
North Region (Cameroon)